Premenstrual syndrome (PMS) is a collection of physical, psychological and emotional symptoms related to a woman's menstrual cycle.

PMS may also refer to:

Computers 
 Process management system, a system for business process management
 Philip's Music Scribe, music scorewriter software
 Pop'n Music Script, a computer file format for rhythm action games
 Project management software
 Property management system, software for hotel management
 Pavement management#Pavement management systems, software for maintaining a road network
 Personalization management system, software for managing the personalization of online user experiences

Nationality and politics 
 Partido Mexicano Socialista, a socialist political party in Mexico
 Presidential Management Staff (Philippines), a government agency
 Prime Ministers, see List of current prime ministers
 Prime Minister's Spokesman, UK civil service post

Science and medicine
 PMS1, a human protein involved in nucleotide mismatch repair
 Medical practice management software, dealing with the management of a medical practice
 Pectoralis minor syndrome
 Postmarketing surveillance, monitoring of a pharmaceutical drug or device
 Pre-main-sequence star, a star that has not yet reached the main sequence
 Phelan-McDermid Syndrome, a rare genetic condition that causes developmental and speech delays, behavioral problems and a weakened ability to feel pain or sweat

Other uses 
 PMS Clan, an all-female gaming clan
 Pantone Matching System, a proprietary color space
 Piedmontese language (ISO 639-3 language code), a language used in northwest Italy.
 Pleasanton Unified School District#Pleasanton Middle School, California, USA
 Pontifical Mission Societies, a group of Catholic missionary societies
 Portsmouth & Southsea railway station (National Rail station code), Hampshire, England
 Pretty Mean Sisters, a 1990s stable in the World Wrestling Federation
 Preventive maintenance schedule, a schedule for preventive maintenance